The Sinogold GM3 is an electric compact multi-purpose vehicle (MPV) produced by Chinese manufacturer Sinogold.

Overview
Sinogold is a state-owned electric vehicle manufacturer based in China’s Shandong Province, and the GM3 is their first passenger car. The Sinogold GM3 is a six seater MPV with a 2-2-2 seating configuration. Prices of the GM3 ranges from 229,800 yuan to 249,800 yuan.

Specifications

The Sinogold GM3 is powered by an electric motor positioned above the front axle with an output of 163 hp and 250 Nm of torque. The range of the Sinogold GM3 depends on the battery options, with 300 kilometers for the 55 kWh battery and 405 kilometers for the 66 kWh battery (NEDC). According to Sinogold, driving with an average speed of 60 km/h can extend the range to 400 kilometer for the 55 kWh battery and to 520 kilometers for the 66 kWh battery. Fully charging the Sinogold GM3 takes 8 hours on a 220V power source or 40 minutes with a fast charger for 80% of the battery charged.

Styling controversies

Originally called the Sinogold G60, the Sinogold GM3 is a controversial vehicle from the styling aspect, as most of the exterior design is an obvious copy of the Citroën Grand C4 Picasso despite the redesigned front and rear down road graphics. As of May 2017, Sinogold was caught using a photoshopped image of the Citroën Grand C4 Picasso for the picture of the Sinogold GM3.

See also

Citroën Grand C4 Picasso- The car that inspired the styling of the Sinogold GM3

References

External links
Sinogold Official Website

Production electric cars
Compact MPVs
Cars introduced in 2017
2010s cars
Cars of China
Sinogold vehicles